Akhtar Mengal (born 6 October 1962) is a politician from Balochistan who is the chairman of Balochistan National Party (Mengal). He previously served as the Chief Minister of Balochistan between 1997 and 1998 and later he served as a member of the Balochistan Provincial Assembly. Mengal currently serves as a member of National Assembly of Pakistan since August 2018.

Early life
Mengal was born on 6 October 1962 in Wadh Balochistan to the former Chief Minister of Balochistan Ataullah Mengal.
Mengal has a son, Gurgain Mengal and a daughter, Banari Mengal.

Political career
Mengal came to Pakistan after ending his self exile in Dubai on 25 March 2013 after four years to participate in 2013 election. The party only has two seats in the 51 member provincial assembly. One is Mengal's and the other is Hamal Kalmati, who represents Gwadar. Two candidates of the BNP, Esa Noori and Raouf Mengal, won national assembly seats from the Makran coastal region and Khuzdar, respectively. He took an oath as a member of National Assembly of Pakistan on 13 August 2018.

Arrest and release
Akhtar Mengal was arrested in September 2006, along with around 700 other political workers, in a government crackdown in Balochistan. He was held because he was planning a long march against President Pervez Musharraf's military rule. Mengal was released on May 9, 2008 and all charges against him were dropped by the Government of Sindh. The Balochistan government  withdrew all cases, including those of sedition, against Mengal.

On 25 March 2013, Mengal returned to Pakistan from Dubai to take part in general elections on 11 May 2013.

Uneasy relationship with the Baloch insurgency 
Akhtar Mengal has been historically criticised by the Baloch insurgents as well as the security establishment. In his interview in 2013, he lamented that, “The Baloch militants consider me a traitor while the security establishment also treats me as an enemy." He is an elder of various such influential families who have their members on both sides of the political divide. Currently a part of the Pakistan Democratic Movement (a 13 party coalition currently in power at the Federal level), the association of his brother and nephews with the Baloch Liberation Army has long been an obstacle to his entry in the mainstream national politics. Javed Mengal (brother) and Nooruddin Mengal and Bhawal Mengal (nephews) have allegedly been involved in armed militancy in the rest province of Balochistan. However, Akhtar Mengal has condemned the insurgents and publicly called for a political solution to the myriad problems in the province.

References

External links
"The Man in the Iron Cage"
"Akhtar Mengal and his BNP"
"The Case against Mengal"
"Nawaz's mistake"

Living people
1962 births
Baloch nationalists
Balochistan MPAs 1997–1999
Pakistani MNAs 2018–2023
Chief Ministers of Balochistan, Pakistan
Aitchison College alumni
People of the insurgency in Balochistan
Balochistan National Party (Mengal) MNAs
Akhtar
Pakistani prisoners and detainees
Balochistan MPAs 2013–2018
Leaders of the Opposition in the Provincial Assembly of Balochistan